Becky Chambers (born 3 May 1985) is an American science fiction writer. She is the author of the Hugo Award-winning Wayfarers series as well as novellas including To Be Taught, if Fortunate and the Monk & Robot series, which begins with the Hugo Award-winning A Psalm for the Wild-Built. She is known for her imaginative world-building and character-driven stories.

Early life, family and education
Chambers was born in 1985 in Southern California and grew up outside Los Angeles. Chambers' family included several people with an interest in various NASA space exploration efforts. Her parents are an astrobiology educator and a satellite engineer. She became fascinated with 'space' and its exploration at an early age. During her youth, after she first encountered a person who believed that such programs were unwise and that their funding would be better applied to solving Earth's problems, she began studying in detail humans’ efforts to explore the cosmos, concluding that these efforts were commendable, although the present methods of funding could be improved. This deep analysis provided much inspiration for her writing.

She moved to San Francisco to study theater arts at the University of San Francisco.

Career
Chambers worked in theater management and as a freelance writer before self-publishing her first novel, The Long Way to a Small, Angry Planet, in 2014, after successfully raising funds on Kickstarter. The novel received critical acclaim and a Kitschies nomination, becoming the first self-published novel to do so. This prompted Hodder & Stoughton and Harper Voyager to pick up and republish the novel. The novel was the first book in the Wayfarer series, which includes three sequels: A Closed and Common Orbit, in 2016; Record of a Spaceborn Few, in 2018; and The Galaxy, and the Ground Within, in 2021. The series won the 2019 Hugo Award for Best Series. She has announced that the Wayfarers series has concluded, however, a fifth Wayfarers book is listed in assorted online bookstores with a 2024 publication date.

She published a novella, To Be Taught, if Fortunate, in August 2019, with a story that was not connected to the Wayfarers books.

In July 2018 it was announced that she signed a two-book deal with Tor Books. The first book, A Psalm for the Wild-Built, was published in May 2021. The story introduced Dex, a travelling tea monk, and Mosscap, a sentient robot. The second book, A Prayer for the Crown-Shy, was published in July 2022 and continued the story of Dex and Mosscap.

Style and themes
Her Wayfarers series novels take place in a fictional universe, governed by the Galactic Commons to which humans are relative newcomers. She has been lauded for the strong world-building in the series, including multiple unique alien races. Reviewers have cited her complex and likeable characters who drive the story. Her work has been alternately criticized and praised for the deliberate, character-driven pacing and lack of the propulsive plots typical of other space opera novels.

Personal life
Chambers has lived in Iceland and Scotland before returning to California, where she currently resides with her wife, Berglaug Asmundardottir, in Humboldt County.

Awards

Bibliography

Novels 
 The Vela, co-written with Yoon Ha Lee, SL Huang, and Rivers Solomon (2019)

Wayfarers series 
 The Long Way to a Small, Angry Planet (2015)
 A Closed and Common Orbit (2016)
 Record of a Spaceborn Few (2018)
 The Galaxy, and the Ground Within (2021)

Novellas
 To Be Taught, if Fortunate (2019)

Monk & Robot series 
 A Psalm for the Wild-Built (2021)
 A Prayer for the Crown-Shy (2022)

Short stories
 "Chrysalis," Jurassic London’s Stocking Stuffer, 2014
 "The Deckhand, The Nova Blade, and the Thrice-Sung Texts," Cosmic Powers: The Saga Anthology of Far-Away Galaxies, 2017
 "Last Contact", 2001: An Odyssey In Words, 2018
 "A Good Heretic" (a Wayfarers story), Infinite Stars: Dark Frontiers, 2019
 “The Tomb Ship”, Lost Worlds & Mythological Kingdoms, 2022

References

1985 births
21st-century American novelists
21st-century American women writers
21st-century American LGBT people
American lesbian writers
American LGBT novelists
American science fiction writers
American women novelists
Hugo Award-winning writers
LGBT people from California
Living people
Women science fiction and fantasy writers
Writers from California